Jhanduke  (sometimes spelled as Jhanduka) is a village in the Sardulgarh tehsil of Mansa district in Punjab, India. Jhunir is the surrounding village.

Demographics
According to 2011 census of India

Religion 
The population mostly follows the Sikhism with Hinduism.

References

Villages in Mansa district, India